Matias Skard (28 May 1846 – 28 July 1927) was a Norwegian philologist, educator, psalmist, essayist and translator.

Biography
Matias Olsen Skard was born on a family farm at Øyer in Gudbrandsdal, Norway. He had planned to study theology but rather began his career as a teacher. He taught at the Latin School in Lillehammer from 1864 to 1868 and at Folk High Schools in Nord-Trøndelag from 1877 to 1881. He chaired the Vonheim Folk High School founded by Christopher Bruun in Østre Gausdal from 1884 to 1890. From 1886 to 1890, he was also co-editor of the newspaper Framgang. He taught at the Teacher's College in Levanger from 1892 to 1901.  In 1901, he was appointed school director in Kristiansand, a  position he retained until he  retired in 1921.

During the 1880s, Skard was in a task group charged with translating the New Testament into the Norwegian language. His brief Nynorsk dictionary  Nynorsk ordbok for rettskriving og literaturlesnad, which was published by Aschehoug in 1912, proved popular and has been a basis for several later editions.

Personal life
Matias  Skard was married three times. He was the father of  horticulturists Olav Skard and Torfinn Skard,  professor  Sigmund Skard, classical philologist Eiliv Skard and Bishop Bjarne Skard.

See also
Norsk Ordbok (Nynorsk)

References

External links
Nynorsk ordbok rettskriving og literaturlesnad (1912)
Matias Skard : en pedagog i sin tid 

1846 births
1927 deaths
People from Øyer
Norwegian educators
Norwegian newspaper editors
Translators of the Bible into Norwegian